The Tancredo Neves Bridge, better known as Fraternity Bridge (Portuguese: Ponte da Fraternidade, Spanish: Puente de la Fraternidad) connects the Brazilian city of Foz do Iguaçu with the Argentine Puerto Iguazú, crossing over the Iguassu River.

The idea of building the bridge had begun after the construction of the Friendship Bridge 1965, between Brazil and Paraguay. The Fraternity Bridge's construction started on January 13, 1982, and was officially inaugurated on November 29, 1985, and named after Brazilian politician Tancredo Neves.

It is of much less economic importance to the region than the Friendship Bridge and does not have the traffic and social problems that the latter one has.

References

Bridges in Brazil
Bridges in Argentina
Bridges completed in 1985
International bridges
Deck arch bridges
Buildings and structures in Misiones Province
Argentina–Brazil border crossings
Foz do Iguaçu
Buildings and structures in Paraná (state)
Transport in Paraná (state)